Tragula is a genus of very small sea snails, marine gastropod molluscs or micromolluscs in the family Pyramidellidae, the pyrams and their allies, and the subfamily Chrysallidinae, a large taxon of minute marine gastropods with an intorted protoconch.

Species
 Tragula falcifera (Watson, 1881)
 Tragula fenestrata (Jeffreys, 1848)
Species brought into synonymy
 Tragula trifuniculata Saurin, 1962: synonym of Chrysallida trifuniculata (Saurin, 1962)
 Tragula unilirata Saurin, 1959: synonym of Turbolidium uniliratum (Saurin, 1959)

References

Pyramidellidae